Etropole Waterfall, known also as Varovitets (Варовитец) is a waterfall in the Balkan Mountains, Bulgaria, located near the Etropole Monastery. It is situated on a small river which flows near the monastery.

Waterfalls of Bulgaria
Balkan mountains
Landforms of Sofia Province